The 1994 Villanova Wildcats football team was an American football team that represented the Villanova University as a member of the Yankee Conference during the 1994 NCAA Division I-AA football season. In their tenth year under head coach Andy Talley, the team compiled a 5–6 record.

Schedule

References

Villanova
Villanova Wildcats football seasons
Villanova Wildcats football